The Jishi Gorge outburst flood was a natural disaster that occurred around 1920 BC in China. The water flow during the eruption was one of the largest fresh water flows to occur in our geologic epoch (Holocene) and caused large widespread flooding around the Yellow River, affecting everyone living in the river basin. The flood outbreak was triggered by the bursting of a dam caused by landslides after an earthquake. The flood is suggested  to possibly be the disaster that gave rise to the Gun-Yu flood myth, which preceded the establishment of the Xia dynasty. The Lajia archaeological site, downstream of the Jishi Gorge, was first destroyed by the earthquake and later covered by sediments from the flood eruption.

The course
The Jishi Gorge (球石峡) leads the Yellow River from the river area around Xunhua in the west through the Jishi Mountain and further east to the river area around the Guanting Basin. An earthquake triggered landslides and rock avalanches that dammed the Yellow River in Jishi Gorge west of Mengda County (孟达乡), in Xunhua County, eastern Qinghai Province, near the border of Gansu Province about 100 kilometre west of Lanzhou. The dam after the earthquake extended 1,300 meters in the direction of the river's flow and its highest level was 240 meters above today's water level. Upstream at Xunhua, a dammed lake filled after the river was blocked at the Jishi Gorge dam.

After less than a year, probably after about six to nine months, the water level approached the top of the dam. In the end, the dam could not withstand the large water masses, and the flood outbreak was triggered when the dam broke. The dammed river basin at Guanting is estimated to have had a level approximately up to 160 or 200 meters above today's water level at the time of the eruption. When the dam broke, the water level in the dammed lake dropped more than 100 meters and released 12 to 16 cubic kilometers of water. Calculations based on both the volume of water and its head in the impoundment area at Xunhua, and also reconstructed cross-sections of the floodplain at Guanting estimate the peak flow at the outlet to be approximately 480,000 cubic meters per second, which is more than 500 times the current flow of the Yellow River at the Jishi Gorge. This is one of the largest known fresh water flows to have occurred during the Holocene.

Effects of the eruption
The flood breached the Yellow River's natural levees and caused widespread flooding, which also potentially changed the course of the Yellow River and had a major impact on all communities along the Yellow River's reach. After the primary flood, prolonged secondary floods likely occurred. The flood may have affected 2,000 kilometers downstream of the Yellow River.

Flood sediments downstream of the dam are found at levels 7 to 50 meters above the present water level. The sediments consist exclusively of angular clasts of greenschist and purple-brown mudrock sourced from Jishi Gorge. At the outlet of the gorge, the sediment layer is 20 meters thick and contains stones up to two meters in diameter.

Finds at the archaeological site of Lajia located 25 kilometers downstream from the dam show the devastation following the earthquake and then the flood, which together completely destroyed the settlement. The site was covered by up to 38 meters thick layer of flood sediments from the eruption. In the archaeological excavation, skeletons have been found inside terraced houses whose positions show people helping each other before they died, and some adults died with children in their arms.

Dating
The damming and flood outbreak occurred during the Qijia culture archaeological period. Radiocarbon dating from Lajia date the eruption rounded to 1920 BC. The measurements were made, among other things, on skeletal parts of human victims after their dwellings collapsed during the earthquake. With a margin of error, measurements gave the date 1922±28 BC.

In mythology

The historical chronicles the Book of Documents and the Records of the Grand Historian describe a great and devastating flood of the Yellow River, which was tamed by Yu the Great. After Yu solved the problem of the flood, the Xia Dynasty was established, which is China's first dynasty. The flood of the Jishi Gorge has great similarities to the great flood described in the chronicles.

In both the Book of Documents and Records of the Grand Historian, it is described that the place where Yu began to fight the river was "Jishi" (積石 / 积石) (literally translated 'amassed stones') which is the same spelling as today's name on the Jishi Gorge.

References

Earthquakes in China
Yellow River floods
Landslides in China
20th-century BC disasters